Alludu Pattina Bharatam is a 1980 Telugu-language drama film directed by K. Viswanath and produced by D. V. S. Raju under D. V. S. Productions. The film stars Krishnam Raju, Jayasudha, Kavita and Nagabhushanam. The music was composed by Chakravarthy.
The dialogues were written by Jandhyala. The lyrics were written by C. Narayana Reddy and Veturi.

Plot

Cast
 Krishnam Raju as Mutyalu
 Jayasudha as Rekha
 Kavita as Radha
 Nagabhushanam
 Ranganath as lecturer
 Rama Prabha as Mamba
 Padmanabham as Mamba's servant
 Allu Rama Lingaiah as Simhachalam
 P. L. Narayana as Mamba's assistant
 Sakshi Ranga Rao as lecturer

Soundtrack

Reception

References

External links
 

1980 films
1980s Telugu-language films
Indian drama films
Films directed by K. Viswanath
Films scored by K. Chakravarthy
1980 drama films